David A. Kyle (February 14, 1919 – September 18, 2016) was an American science fiction writer and member of science fiction fandom.

Professional career

Kyle served as a reporter in the Air Force Reserves with the rank of lieutenant colonel, writing civil defense material, while working at radio station WPDM in Potsdam, New York.

With Martin Greenberg, Kyle founded Gnome Press in 1948.  He wrote two pictorial histories of science fiction (A Pictorial History of Science Fiction and The Illustrated Book of Science Fiction Ideas and Dreams) and three licensed novels set in the Lensman universe (The Dragon Lensman, Lensman from Rigel and Z-Lensman).

He appeared with Paul Levinson, Greg Bear and many others on the History Channel's 2002 documentary, Fantastic Voyage: Evolution of Science Fiction. He died at the age of 97 on September 18, 2016.

Fandom

Kyle, an active fan since the earliest days of organized science fiction fandom, was an original member of New York's Futurians. In 1936, he published The Fantasy World, possibly the first comics fanzine.

He attended the first Worldcon, and both wrote and printed the "Yellow Pamphlet" condemning the organizers. The manifesto led chairman Sam Moskowitz to ban several prominent members of the Futurians from that convention.

Kyle chaired the 1956 14th World Science Fiction Convention (NyCon II), an incident at which inspired the fan catchphrase, "Dave Kyle says you can't sit here." He was created a Knight of The Order of Saint Fantony in 1961, and was awarded the Big Heart Award in 1973. Kyle was also Fan Guest of Honor at ConStellation, the 41st World Science Fiction Convention, in 1983.

In addition, he wrote hundreds of articles for various fanzines, including regular articles for Richard and Nicki Lynch's Mimosa.

Kyle married another fan, Ruth Evelyn Landis (whom he had met through fandom), on August 31, 1957; for their honeymoon they flew to England for the 1957 Worldcon there, together with 53 friends and in-laws, on a specially chartered flight. They remained married until her death on January 5, 2011. They had a son Arthur and a daughter Kerry.

References

External links

 Detailed biography and links to Kyle's articles for Mimosa
 Information on Kyle's three authorized "Second Stage Lensman" novels
 Articles about Futurians and old Fandom by David Kyle

1919 births
2016 deaths
20th-century American novelists
American male novelists
American publishers (people)
American science fiction writers
Futurians
People from St. Lawrence County, New York
Science fiction editors
20th-century American male writers
Novelists from New York (state)